Shark fin dumpling is a dim sum dish in Hong Kong. It is a form of Dumpling in Superior Soup, a dumpling with gelatinous broth inside. As with shark fin soup, the shark fin content is often replaced with an imitation.

History
Dumpling in Superior Soup originated from Ming dynasty in Yangzhou. In that time, pigskin was a preferred ingredient of brewis. As pigskin is composed of collagen which is a main component of connective tissue, brewis would be solidified after it was dissolved, forming a gel-like structure. It would then be integrated into bread for consumption. According to the Qing dynasty cookbook Suiyuan shidan this is the ancestral form of dumpling in superior soup.

The use of shark fin as an ingredient of dumplings appeared in the 1980s, when the economy of Hong Kong was growing rapidly. Part of the Chinese restaurants would like to produce something luxury so as to emphasize the class difference or attract consumers. As time went on, actual shark fin was sometimes replaced by thin bean noodle.

Ingredients and preparation
The standard ingredients include shark fin, meirou, shrimp, crab sticks, shiitake and straw mushrooms. The dish is prepared with red agar for texture, and seasoned with salt, MSG, sugar, meal-cake, and ground white pepper.

With mass production commonly seen today, there can be a great variance from the traditional cooking method, quality, and ingredient composition. Reduction in filling quantity, cheaper raw materials, and substitution of ingredients is not uncommon. Chicken shreds can be replaced by ham shreds, prawn replaced by dried shrimp, mushroom varieties swapped, and the amount of shark's fin reduced.

Evolution
Over time, Hong Kong chefs have updated the classic recipe to appeal to customers. Some of these developments include:
 Green Shark's Fin & Prawn Dumpling (翡翠魚翅灌湯餃) in which the fin is mixed with vegetable juice during cooking for colour and flavour. 
 Shark's Fin & Prawn Dumpling with Bamboo Pith (竹笙魚翅灌湯餃)
 Shark's Fin & Prawn Dumpling with crab-meat (蟹肉魚翅灌湯餃)
 Vegetarian Shark's Fin & Prawn Dumpling (素翅灌湯餃) - Nowadays, Hong Kongers are more environmental friendly. Therefore, some of the restaurants use ’fake shark’s fin’ to replace the shark's fin to avoid killing sharks in order to protect this species. The ’fake shark’s fin’ is mainly made of Gelatin or Konjac, some of them may be made of the bean vermicelli. Since it does not include any animal's ingredients, it is also suitable for vegetarian. Other than that, it is cheaper than shark's fin; the production cost can be lower. Therefore, this shark's fin & prawn dumpling is one of example of adaptability.

Restaurants
In the past, shark's fin and prawn dumpling has traditionally been a luxury dim sum, with only a select number of dim sum establishments offering the dish. These restaurants used expensive materials to make the filling like plenty of shark's fin, chicken shreds, Shiitake mushrooms, prawn, pork, etc. The cooking method, time-consuming in nature, requires the soup to be filled into the dumpling then steamed in a bamboo steamer. As there is only one formal cooking method, fewer chiefs know how to make the dish in accordance with the traditional approach.

Today, societal changes have affected the nature and availability of the dish. A growing number of people are wealthy enough to afford luxury cuisine, and growing competition in the catering industry has led to a proliferation in the types of dim sum available in Hong Kong. There are currently several variations of shark's fin & prawn dumpling, such as vegetarian options, to meet differences in customer preferences. Availability and popularity has also increased. Some stores sell take-out dim sum, and supermarkets commonly stock frozen versions of shark's fin and prawn dumpling.

See also
Freshwater prawn farming
Shark finning
Shark fin soup
:zh:魚翅餃

References

 Cookery Family-灌湯餃. 2005 (cited 2012 Nov 3)
Private Cooking Art magazine. Page 96–97.  Tam, S.M. 1997. 
 Eating Metropolitaneity: Hong Kong, Identity in yumcha. The Chinese University of Hong Kong. Retrieved November 19, 2012 
Yuan, M. 隨園食單 (Suiyuan shidan). China Confucius Foundation. Retrieved November 18, 2012 
Samuel. 2006, September, 15. DP&artsection=CAREER 有緣重遇 - 久違的灌湯餃. Jiujik. Retrieved November 3, 2012
灌湯餃 (Dumpling in soup). (N.D). Cookery Family. Retrieved November 3, 2012
Foodies’ Notes : 真正的灌湯入餃. 2012, April, 25. The Sun Online. Retrieved November 3, 2012

Shark finning
Dim sum
Hong Kong cuisine